Magnolia Plantation, built in 1858, is a private residence located on Louisiana Highway 311, west of New Orleans and  south of Schriever, Louisiana. The plantation was built to cultivate cotton, which was a critical part of Terrebonne Parish's antebellum economy. The plantation house is one of six surviving Greek Revival plantation houses in the parish. A portion of the film 12 Years a Slave was filmed at the plantation.

The plantation was added to the National Register of Historic Places in 1983.

Further reading
 Menn, Joseph K. The Large Slaveholders of Louisiana – 1860. Gretna: Pelican Publishing Company, 1964.
 Stahls, Paul F., Jr. Plantation Homes of the Lafourche Country. Gretna: Pelican Publishing Company, 1976.

References 

Houses on the National Register of Historic Places in Louisiana
Greek Revival houses in Louisiana
Houses completed in 1858
Houses in Terrebonne Parish, Louisiana
National Register of Historic Places in Terrebonne Parish, Louisiana